The Caribou, colloquially referred to as The Newfie Bullet, was a passenger train operated by Canadian National Railways (CNR) on the island of Newfoundland.

History
The Dominion of Newfoundland became the 10th province of Canada when it entered Confederation on March 31, 1949. At that time, CNR  took over the operations of the Newfoundland Railway, a  narrow gauge railway network running across the island.

At the time that CNR took over operations, the premiere cross-island passenger train was called The Overland Limited.  CNR renamed this train in 1950 to the Caribou and it maintained approximately the same 23-hour schedule from St. John's (also the eastern terminus of the railway on Newfoundland), to the system's western terminus at the ferry terminal in Port aux Basques, where connecting ferry services to the North American railway network at North Sydney, Nova Scotia, were made.

The 23 hour schedule sealed the fate of the Caribou when the Trans-Canada Highway opened across the island in 1965, allowing automobiles to travel between Port aux Basques and St. John's in under 12 hours.  CN withdrew the dedicated passenger trains in July 1969 and instituted a bus service, marketed under the name "Road Cruiser."  CN maintained limited "mixed" passenger and freight train service to certain isolated communities on the island until the complete abandonment of its narrow gauge system in the fall of 1988. The CN Roadcruiser Bus service operated until March 29, 1996, when it was sold to DRL Coachlines of Triton, Newfoundland.

See also
 Terra Transport
 Newfoundland T'Railway
 Canadian National
 Newfoundland Railway

Caribou
Railway services introduced in 1950
Canadian National Railway passenger trains
Passenger rail transport in Newfoundland and Labrador
Railway services discontinued in 1969